This is a list of college football All-Americans who have played at the University of Texas at Austin.

Key
* Denotes Consensus All-America Selection
‡ Denotes Unanimous All-America Selection

All-Americans

Texas Longhorns

Texas Longhorns football All-Americans
Texas Longhorns football All-Americans